Gymnommopsis cordubensis is a species of fly in the genus Gymnommopsis of the family Tachinidae.

References

Tachinidae
Insects described in 1943